The Right Kind of Wrong may refer to:

 "The Right Kind of Wrong", a song by Diane Warren from Coyote Ugly
 The Right Kind of Wrong, a 2013 Canadian film